Newbridge is a hamlet on the Isle of Wight. It is situated on a small hill, nine kilometres to the west of Newport on the western half of the island. According to the Post Office the 2011 Census population of the  hamlet was included in the civil parish of Shalfleet.

The village has a social club, situated in the old school house, and a holiday park with indoor and outdoor swimming pools and the villages only remaining shop.

There have never been any churches in Newbridge but the hamlet did have two chapels.  One was demolished in the early 1980s and the remaining Newbridge Wesleyan Methodist Chapel is now part of a residence.

The name Newbridge is explained by the bridge near the edge of the village which crosses the Calbourne this being literally the "New Bridge".  The Calbourne stream runs through nearby Calbourne passing through Newbridge and Shalfleet and discharges into the Solent at Newtown.

Newbridge is served by Southern Vectis bus route 7.

References

External links

Villages on the Isle of Wight